Sharr White is an American playwright and screenwriter. He's known for his Broadway plays The Other Place (2011), The Snow Geese (2013), and Pictures From Home (2023). He's also known as a producer and writer for Showtime series The Affair (2015-2019), the Starz series Sweetbitter (2019), the HBO Max series Generation (2021), and the Netflix limited series Halston (2021).

His plays have also been produced at several regional venues, including at South Coast Repertory, Actors Theatre of Louisville, Oregon Shakespeare Festival, Lincoln Center Theatre's Directors Lab and Key West Theatre Festival.

Career
Iris Fields was developed at the Lincoln Center Theatre Directors Lab and performed at the Key West Theatre Festival in 1996. The Sun-Sentinel reviewer wrote: "The best-directed and -acted show in the festival, Sharr White's drama is about the devastating effects of the Civil War on a Midwestern family... director Joan McGillis shepherds the actors past most of the cracks in White's still-nascent script. Style and structure need much work, but the exciting potential is undeniable."

White's play Six Years received its world premiere at the Humana Festival of New American Plays at Actors Theatre of Louisville in March 2006. The curtainup.com reviewer wrote: "This serious, slice-of-life drama, extremely well written and superbly acted, may be considered old-fashioned by some who see it as soap opera. But it could have a long life in regional theatre if not in New York."

Sunlight premiered at the Marin Theatre Company, Mill Valley, California, in January–February 2010, and in Seattle, Washington at ArtsWest in March–April 2010. The Seattle Times reviewer wrote: "Articulate and probing, if at times straining for effect, "Sunlight" (a National New Play Network selection) sheds some rays on the provocative matter of terrorism and torture." Sunlight received an Edgerton Foundation New American Play Awards, 2009.

Annapurna premiered at the Magic Theatre, San Francisco, California, in November 2011, with direction by Loretta Greco and featuring Rod Gnapp and Denise Cormier. The play next ran at The Odyssey Theatre, Los Angeles, California from April 2013 through June 2013, and starred Megan Mullally and Nick Offerman with direction by Bart DeLorenzo. The play opened Off-Broadway at the Acorn Theatre, in a production by The New Group on April 13, 2014 (previews) through June 1, 2014. Mullally and Offerman again star, with direction by Bart DeLorenzo.

His Broadway debut was his play The Other Place, which was produced by the Manhattan Theatre Club, and opened at the Samuel J. Friedman Theatre from December 2012 (in previews) through March 3, 2013. The play, directed by Joe Mantello, starred Laurie Metcalf and Daniel Stern. It was originally produced Off-Broadway by the MCC Theater in 2011. The New York Times reviewer of the Off-Broadway production wrote:"A sense of disorientation unites audience and protagonist in 'The Other Place,' a new drama by Sharr White about a forceful businesswoman confronting the onset of an illness whose nature keeps eluding her grasp. The play... is dominated by a compelling, at times scarily intense performance from Laurie Metcalf." The Other Place received two Outer Critics Circle Award nominations, for Outstanding New Off-Broadway Play
and Outstanding Actress In A Play (Laurie Metcalf).

White's play The Snow Geese premiered on Broadway in a joint Manhattan Theatre Club MCC Theatre production at the Samuel J. Friedman Theatre. The play ran from October 24, 2013 through December 15, 2013 and starred Mary-Louise Parker, Danny Burstein, and Victoria Clark, and was directed by Daniel J. Sullivan. The play takes place during WWI and, according to the USA Today reviewer, is "...a lovely, moving account of a clan's struggle to adapt to trying circumstances and a changing world."

White has also written for television, contributing episodes of The Affair (2015-2018), Halston (2021) and Generation (2021).

In 2023, White premiered his latest play Pictures From Home on Broadway at Studio 54. The memory play is adapted from the book of the same name by photographer Larry Sultan. The play stars Nathan Lane, Danny Burstein, and Zoë Wanamaker. The play revolves around a son photographing his parents in their Californian home in the 1980s.

Work

Television 
 The Affair (2015-2018) - producer / co-executive producer / writer 
 Sweetbitter (2019) - executive producer / writer
 Generation (2021) - executive producer / writer
 Halston (2021) - Producer (showrunner) / writer

Theatre 
 The Other Place (2011) - playwright
 The Snow Geese (2014) - playwright 
 Pictures From Home (2023) - playwright

Accolades 
 2022 - Writers Guild of America Awards - Halston (nominee)

References

External links

 
Internet Off-Broadway Database Listing

White
American male dramatists and playwrights
American male television writers
21st-century American male writers
People from Frederick, Maryland
People from Orange County, California
Writers from Maryland
Writers from California
San Francisco State University alumni
20th-century American dramatists and playwrights
20th-century American male writers